McVickar  is a surname. Notable people with the surname include:

 Harry Whitney McVickar (1860–1905), American artist, illustrator, and real estate investor
 Lansing McVickar (1895–1945), United States Army officer
 William N. McVickar (1843–1910), Episcopal Bishop of Rhode Island

See also
 McVicker
 McVicar